Edson Luques Bindilatti (born 13 March 1979 in Camamu, Bahia) is a decathlete and bobsledder from Brazil.

Career
As a decathlete, Bindilatti won a silver medal at the 1996 South American Junior Championships and then took gold medals at the 1997 and 1998 South American Junior Championships. He took the silver medal at the 1999 South American Championships, then the gold medals at the 2001 and 2003 South Junior Championships, the first gold in a competition record of 7564 points. Against European competitors as well, he won the 2000 Ibero-American Championships and the silver medal at the 2002 Ibero-American Championships. He became the national champion six times, from 1999 through 2004.

Bindilatti took up bobsleigh after being approached by Eric Maleson in 1999: Bindilatti was unfamiliar with the sport, and agreed to take it up after Maleson asked him to watch the film Cool Runnings. He competed for Brazil at the 2002 and 2006 Winter Olympics.

He competed for Brazil at the 2014 Winter Olympics in the four-man competition where he placed in 29th position out of 30 teams along with Fábio Gonçalves Silva, Edson Martins and Odirlei Pessoni.

Bindilatti was selected as flag bearer for the Brazilian team in the opening ceremony of the 2018 Winter Olympics in Pyeongchang. He was part of the Brazilian crews which finished 27th in the two-man and 23rd in the four-man competitions at those Games.

He qualified to represent Brazil at the 2022 Winter Olympics.

References

External links

1979 births
Living people
Sportspeople from Bahia
Brazilian decathletes
Brazilian male bobsledders
Bobsledders at the 2002 Winter Olympics
Bobsledders at the 2006 Winter Olympics
Bobsledders at the 2014 Winter Olympics
Bobsledders at the 2018 Winter Olympics
Bobsledders at the 2022 Winter Olympics
Olympic bobsledders of Brazil